UFO Hunters is an American television series that premiered on January 30, 2008, on The History Channel, produced by Motion Picture Production Inc., and ran for three seasons. Jon Alon Walz was the executive producer of the show and was responsible for selling the series to History Channel after a bidding war for the rights to the show broke out between History Channel and Sci-Fi Channel (now Syfy).

Prior to selling UFO Hunters to History Channel, Walz and Motion Picture Production Inc., created and executive produced several hit UFO and paranormal specials for History, including "Russian Roswell", "Deep Sea UFOs", and "The Pacific's Bermuda Triangle". William J. Birnes was the star and co-creator of the UFO Hunters series.

The concept for the show was tested in a segment of History Channel's 2006 UFO special entitled "Deep Sea UFOs", produced by Motion Picture Production Inc, which featured two of the final four cast members. UFO Hunters was not a direct spin-off from a 2005 History Channel special with the same title, but they did use images from the 2005 special to promote the premiere of the new series. The tagline of the show is: "Hoax or History?" The series should not be confused with a similarly themed and titled UFO Hunters, a special that debuted the same day and time on the Sci-Fi Channel, (now SyFy), and created by the producers of Ghost Hunters, but which only aired one episode.

The series was one of the first fully HD-produced, 16x9 format, reality series on cable. In the US, History Channel only released the first two seasons on DVD in the correct airdate order. However, the format was only released in full screen (1:33:1) instead of wide screen. In the UK, History Channel released the third and final season on DVD, but the episodes were released in the incorrect airdate order. In a 2011 interview with podcaster Jim Harold, William J. Birnes claimed that after the Dulce Base episode aired, the show was canceled by top level executives at History Channel.

Format
The show follows numerous investigations (referred to as "cases" in the beginning of each episode) led by William J. Birnes and his team of experts: researcher and scuba diver Pat Uskert, mechanical engineer and MIT researcher Ted Acworth, and investigative biologist Jeff Tomlinson. In the second season, Tomlinson departed. In the third season, Acworth was replaced by mechanical engineer Kevin Cook.

In each episode, the team investigates reports of unidentified aerial phenomena, including interviewing witnesses of close encounters with UFOs, USOs (unidentified submerged objects), and supposed extraterrestrial life. They also analyze any evidence collected such as photographs, video, or recovered physical material. They also conduct research with other investigators and scientists in the field in an attempt to find conclusive evidence that a report is real or a hoax. The show includes investigations of long-standing UFO cases, such as the Roswell, New Mexico UFO crash incident and other famous sightings throughout history.

The opening theme song "The Only One" was performed by the band Operator. In later seasons the song was removed and the opening theme was changed.

Series overview

Episodes

Season 1 (2008)
Season 1 aired from January 30, 2008, to May 7, 2008.

Season 2 (2008–09)
Season 2 aired from October 29, 2008, to February 25, 2009.

Season 3 (2009)
History ended Season 3 of the series abruptly on May 20, 2009, and the last four episodes that were produced were never broadcast. According to his Facebook page, Bill Birnes headed up an online petition for History to continue the series. On October 29, 2009, History aired the last four episodes as a four-hour marathon.

See also
 List of topics characterized as pseudoscience
 Ancient Aliens
 UFO Files
 Hangar 1: The UFO Files
 Unidentified flying object (UFO)

References

External links
 
 

Paranormal television
History (American TV channel) original programming
UFO-related television
2000s American reality television series
2008 American television series debuts
2009 American television series endings